Icelandic nationality law details the conditions by which an individual is a national of Iceland. The primary law governing these requirements is the Icelandic Nationality Act, which came into force on 1 January 1953. Iceland is a member state of the European Free Trade Association (EFTA). All Icelandic nationals have automatic and permanent permission to live and work in any European Union (EU) or EFTA country.

Any person born within Iceland to at least one Icelandic parent receives citizenship at birth. Children born overseas are also Icelandic citizens if they are born to a married Icelandic parent, or to an unmarried Icelandic mother. Individuals born to an unmarried Icelandic father are eligible to acquire citizenship by registration before age 18. Foreign nationals may naturalise after meeting a minimum residence requirement (usually five years), proving financial self-sufficiency, demonstrating proficiency in the Icelandic language, and passing a good character requirement with supporting testimonials from two Icelandic citizens.

Terminology 
The distinction between the meaning of the terms citizenship and nationality is not always clear in the English language and differs by country. Generally, nationality refers a person's legal belonging to a state and is the common term used in international treaties when referring to members of that polity; citizenship refers to the set of rights and duties a person has in that nation.

In Icelandic legislation, the term "citizenship" is used to refer to state membership. "Nationality" is used in other laws but usually refers to a person's ethnic group. While the difference between these two terms is not precise in general discourse within Iceland, "citizenship" would be the technical term used in domestic legislation to refer to members of the national constituency. Despite this, the Icelandic government translates the name of the principal act governing citizenship requirements as the "Icelandic Nationality Act".

History 

Iceland was first settled by Norsemen and Celts in the eighth and ninth centuries. No unified governing body existed until the 10th century when local chieftains formed the Althing, which established a set of local laws closely following those of Norway. The Icelandic clans swore fealty to the Norwegian king in 1262–1264, and the island later fell under Danish rule when the entire Kingdom of Norway became part of the Kalmar Union in 1397. Iceland remained part of the Kingdom of Denmark despite Norway's separation in 1814, and Danish nationality law became applicable to the island in 1898 when the Folketing enacted its first nationality legislation. This law established descent from Danes as the primary means of acquiring Danish nationality.

Iceland became a fully independent kingdom in 1918, although it remained in personal union with Denmark. The Danish–Icelandic Act of Union did not establish a separate nationality at the time of independence, and when Iceland did enact its own nationality legislation in 1919, the new law essentially mirrored the regulations set out in the 1898 Danish law.

Prior to 1 July 1982, the acquisition of Icelandic citizenship from an Icelandic mother was restricted. Those born to an Icelandic mother and a foreign father between 1 July 1964 and 30 June 1982 may be permitted to apply for Icelandic citizenship by declaration.

With effect from 1 July 2003, there are no restrictions on Icelandic citizens holding dual citizenship. Prior to that date, dual citizenship was only permitted in limited circumstances (such as where another citizenship was acquired alongside Icelandic citizenship at birth). Applicants have not been required to renounce any foreign citizenship they may hold.

European integration 
Iceland joined the European Free Trade Association (EFTA) in 1970. When the European Communities became the European Union (EU) in 1992, the consequent creation of EU citizenship allowed nationals of all EU countries to live and work in any other member state. The scope of these free movement rights was expanded with the establishment of the European Economic Area (EEA) in 1994 to include nationals of all EEA member states, which included the entire EFTA except for Liechtenstein and Switzerland. Liechtenstein later acceded to the EEA in 1995, while Switzerland concluded a separate free movement agreement with the EU that came into force in 2002.

Acquisition and loss of citizenship

Entitlement by birth, descent, or adoption 
Any person born within Iceland to at least one parent who is an Icelandic citizen automatically receives citizenship at birth. Children born overseas are also Icelandic citizens if they are born to a married Icelandic parent, or to an unmarried Icelandic mother. Individuals born overseas to an Icelandic father and foreign national mother who are unmarried are eligible to acquire citizenship by registration before the age of 18; children born to such couples automatically become Icelandic citizens if the parents later marry. Foreign children under the age of 12 adopted in the country by Icelandic citizens are automatically granted citizenship at the time of adoption, while those adopted abroad may become citizens on request by the adopting parents to the Icelandic government. Abandoned children found in the country are considered to be Icelandic unless evidence can be found establishing their possession of an alternate nationality.

Facilitated acquisition for resident children 
Foreign children with a long period of residence in the country may be eligible for a facilitated process of naturalisation. Any foreign national who continuously resides in Iceland from age 11 to 18, or a stateless individual domiciled from age 13 to 18, are entitled to acquire Icelandic citizenship by declaration before age 20. Stateless children born in Iceland who have not acquired Icelandic citizenship, the right to acquire Icelandic citizenship, or any other nationality by age 3 may be granted citizenship at the discretion of the Minister of Justice.

Voluntary acquisition 
Foreigners may become Icelandic citizens by naturalisation after residing in the country for more than seven years. The residency requirement is reduced to three years if an applicant is married to an Icelandic citizen, four years for citizens of other Nordic countries, or five years for recognised refugees. Applicants must demonstrate proficiency in the Icelandic language, be financially self-sufficient, and pass a good character requirement supported by testimonials from two Icelandic citizens. Additionally, they may not have any outstanding tax obligations, have declared bankruptcy, or received state assistance during the preceding three years. Any person who has been fined or incarcerated for a criminal offense, or is a defendant in a pending criminal case, for any conduct that would be deemed a crime in Iceland may be disqualified from naturalisation.

Individuals wishing to become citizens but do not meet all of the naturalisation criteria may nevertheless petition the Althing for a direct grant of citizenship through statutory law. This method of awarding citizenship is not bound by any specific criteria and is routinely considered by the legislature twice per year. Non-naturalised citizens of other Nordic countries are also entitled to acquire Icelandic citizenship by declaration after seven years of residence in Iceland.

Loss and resumption 
Icelandic citizenship may apply to be released from their citizenship by the Minister of Justice, provided that the applicant ordinarily resides overseas and already possesses or is in the process of obtaining another nationality. An Icelandic citizen resident within Iceland cannot be released from their citizenship, unless the Minister determines that there is sufficient reason to do so.

Citizenship may be involuntarily removed from any citizen who was born abroad and has never been permanently resident in Iceland, or resided in the country for any reason that could be interpreted as wishing to remain an Icelandic citizen, before age 22. Such individuals may nevertheless apply to retain their citizenship provided that they do so also before the age of 22. Former citizens who naturalise in another Nordic country and later reacquire domicile in Iceland may reacquire Icelandic citizenship by formally notifying the government of their intention to do so. Individuals who acquired citizenship by birth and resided in the country until age 18 but later loses Icelandic citizenship may regain it by declaration, provided that they are domiciled in Iceland for two years prior to their declaration.

References

Sources

Legislation

External links 
 Iceland Directorate of Immigration

Nationality law
Law of Iceland